Peam Aek is a khum (commune) of Aek Phnum District in Battambang Province in north-western Cambodia. Close to this place is the temple site of Wat Ek Phnom.

Villages

 Doun Teav
 Suos Ei
 Peam Aek
 Kong Tum
 Ka Rohal
 Preaek Chdaor
 Ta Kom
 Kouk Doung

References

Communes of Battambang province
Aek Phnum District